The men's triple jump at the 2016 European Athletics Championships took place at the Olympic Stadium on 7 and 9 July.

Records

Schedule

Results

Qualification

Qualification: 16.65 m (Q) or best 12 performances (q)

Final

References

External links
 amsterdam2016.org, official championship site

Triple Jump M
Triple jump at the European Athletics Championships